Three Hats for Lisa or One Day in London is a 1965 British musical comedy film directed by Sidney Hayers and starring Joe Brown, Sid James, Sophie Hardy, Una Stubbs and Dave Nelson.

Plot
Three young Cockneys take a day off work to meet Lisa Milan, an Italian movie star, at Heathrow airport. She travels with them and their taxi driver in search of some typically British hats. The rule of the game is to steal a hat from its wearer. Lisa wants a bobby's helmet, a businessman's bowler, and the bearskin cap off a palace guard. A musical chase ensues around Swinging Sixties London, evading press and police.

Cast
 Joe Brown - Johnny Howjego
 Sophie Hardy - Lisa Milan
 Una Stubbs - Flora
 Sid James - Sid Marks
 Dave Nelson - Sammy
 Peter Bowles - Pepper
 Seymour Green - Signor Molfino
 Josephine Blake - Miss Penny
 Jeremy Lloyd - Guards Officer
 Michael Brennan - Police Sergeant
 Eric Barker - Station Sergeant
 Howard Douglas - Cinema caretaker
 Dickie Owen - Policeman
 Norman Mitchell - Truck driver
 Arnold Bell - Hilton Doorman
 Barrie Gosney - Reporter

Musical numbers
All songs were written by Leslie Bricusse

 "This is a Special Day" (written by Leslie Bricusse and Robin Beaumont)  Performed by Joe Brown
 "The Boy on the Corner of the Street Where I Live" Performed by Una Stubbs, Sandra Hampton and Beth McDonald
 "Something Tells Me (I Shouldn’t Do This)" Performed by Joe Brown, Una Stubbs and Dave Nelson
 "I'm the King of the Castle" Performed by Joe Brown, Una Stubbs and Dave Nelson
 "Bermondsey" Performed by Joe Brown, Sophie Hardy, Sid James, Una Stubbs and Dave Nelson
 "L O N D O N (London Town)" Performed by Joe Brown, Sophie Hardy, Sid James, Una Stubbs and Dave Nelson
 "Three Hats for Lisa" Performed by Joe Brown, Sophie Hardy, Sid James, Una Stubbs and Dave Nelson
 "Two Cockney Kids" Performed by Joe Brown and Una Stubbs
 "Have You Heard About Johnny Howjego?" Performed by Sid James, Una Stubbs and Dave Nelson and chorus
 "That's What Makes A Girl A Girl" Performed by Joe Brown, Sophie Hardy, Sid James, Una Stubbs and Dave Nelson
 "I Fell in Love With An Englishman" Performed by Sophie Hardy
 "A Man's World" Performed by Sophie Hardy
 "Covent Garden" Performed by Joe Brown, Sophie Hardy, Sid James, Una Stubbs and Dave Nelson and chorus
 "One Day in London" Performed by Chorus
 "St. Patrick's Day" (traditional) performed by the Band of the Irish Guards

References

External links 

1965 films
British musical comedy films
1965 musical comedy films
Films directed by Sidney Hayers
Films shot at Pinewood Studios
Films with screenplays by Talbot Rothwell
1960s English-language films
1960s British films